Michael Canavan is a retired United States Army Lieutenant General and former Federal Aviation Administration security official.

Michael Canavan may also refer to:

Michael Canavan (politician) (born 1924), Irish politician and business owner
Michael Noel Canavan (born 1958), Irish Garda officer
Michael Canavan (actor), American actor; see First Flight (Star Trek: Enterprise)